The Pride of the Legion is a 1932 American pre-Code crime film directed by Ford Beebe and starring Victor Jory, Barbara Kent and Sally Blane.

Cast

References

Bibliography
 Tuska, Jon. The Vanishing Legion: A History of Mascot Pictures, 1927-1935. McFarland, 1999.

External links
 

1932 films
1932 crime films
American crime films
Films directed by Ford Beebe
Mascot Pictures films
1930s English-language films
1930s American films